Mike Metcalf (24 May 1939, Liverpool – 26 December 2018) was an English professional footballer who made more than 300 appearances in The Football League for Wrexham and Chester.

Metcalf began his career with Everton, before joining Wrexham as a part-timer in May 1957 to allow him to complete a degree course in chemistry. Over the next six years he scored 58 times in 121 league games for Wrexham before switching to local rivals Chester for £5,000 in December 1963. The following season saw Chester score 141 in Fourth Division, FA Cup and Football League Cup matches, with Metcalf netting 37 of them. His fellow forwards Jimmy Humes, Elfed Morris, Hugh Ryden and Gary Talbot also all scored at least 20 goals during the campaign.

Between October 1964 and September 1967, Metcalf started a club record 127 consecutive league games. The record remained intact until March 2009, when it was broken by goalkeeper John Danby. Metcalf remained with Chester until the 1968–69 season, playing his final Football League game in a 2–0 defeat to Workington on 30 November 1968.

Over the following years, Metcalf had spells playing for Altrincham, Bangor City and Rhyl and then became player-manager at Connah's Quay Nomads and Witton Albion. Metcalf then ran his own chemical company, Metlab Supplies Ltd, and continued to play local football in the Chester area.

He is sometimes referred to as Mick Metcalf.

Honours

Wrexham
Football League Fourth Division promotion as third placed team: 1961–62

Bibliography

References

1939 births
2018 deaths
English footballers
Association football forwards
English Football League players
Everton F.C. players
Wrexham A.F.C. players
Chester City F.C. players
Altrincham F.C. players
Bangor City F.C. players
Rhyl F.C. players
Connah's Quay Nomads F.C. players
Witton Albion F.C. players
English football managers
Connah's Quay Nomads F.C. managers
Witton Albion F.C. managers
Footballers from Liverpool